

Manufacturers 
x86-compatible processors have been designed, manufactured and sold by a number of companies, including:

x86-processors for regular PCs  
Intel
AMD
Zhaoxin 

In the past:
Transmeta (discontinued its x86 line)
Rise Technology (acquired by SiS, that sold its x86 (embedded) line to DM&P)
IDT (Centaur Technology x86 division acquired by VIA)
Cyrix (acquired by National Semiconductor)
National Semiconductor (sold the x86 PC designs to VIA and later the x86 embedded designs to AMD)
NexGen (acquired by AMD)
Chips and Technologies (acquired by Intel)
Texas Instruments (discontinued its own x86 line)
IBM (discontinued its own x86 line)
UMC (discontinued its x86 line)
NEC (discontinued its x86 line)
VM Technology (discontinued its x86 line)
VIA

x86-processors for embedded designs only 
DM&P Electronics (continues SiS' Vortex86 line)
ZF Micro ZFx86, Cx486DX SoC
RDC Semiconductors 486SX compatible RISC core (R8610 and R8620)
DP Kwazar SP (ДП КВАЗАР-ІС) - As of December 2021, КР1810ВМ86 (Soviet 8086 clone) still appears on Kwazar's price list.
In the past:
ALi (x86 products went to Nvidia through the ULi sale)
Nvidia (M6117C - 386SX embedded microcontroller)
Auctor / ACC Micro - Maple SoC (Cx486DX4 core at 100-133 Mhz) 
Advantech - EVA-X4150 and EVA-X4300 (SoCs with 486SX-compatible processors at 150MHz and 300MHz, respectively)
Innovasic - pin-compatible 80186/80188 clones
Vadem - VG230 and VG330 (SoCs with NEC V30 CPU cores, manufacturing continued by Amphus)
SiS (sold its Vortex86 line to DM&P)
Intersil (x86 line, that is up to 80286 compatible, discontinued)
VAutomation - offered synthesizable x86 cores, in particular the Turbo 186, that has been implemented in ASICs from numerous vendors, e.g.
 Zoran Corporation: Vaddis 6
 Genesis Microchip Inc: GM1601
 Lantronix: DSTni-EX, DSTni-LX
 Synergetic: EC-1

Open source x86 cores 
ao486 open source FPGA implementation of the 486SX (currently targets the Terasic Altera DE2-115)
S80186 open source 80186 compatible FPGA implementation
Zet open source 80186 compatible FPGA implementation targeting the Xilinx ML403 and Altera DE1

x86-SoCs for mobile devices 
Rockchip (Intel SoFIA)
Spreadtrum (Intel SoFIA)

Manufacturing-only of x86-processors designed by others 
GlobalFoundries (manufactures processors for AMD)
IBM (manufactures processors for ZF Micro and VIA; discontinued production for NexGen and Transmeta)
TSMC (manufactures processors for AMD and VIA; discontinued production for Transmeta)
Fujitsu (manufactures processors for VIA; manufactured processors for Transmeta)

In the past:
UMC (manufactured processors for Rise, SiS, ALi, ULi and Nvidia; discontinued x86 production)
National Semiconductor (manufactured processors for ZF Micro; discontinued x86 production)
DEC (manufactured 486 processors for AMD; discontinued x86 production)

Manufactured and sold under its own name of x86-processors designed by others 
Early Intel x86 CPU designs (up to the 80286) have in the past been second-sourced by the following manufacturers under licence from Intel:

Manufacturers that have served as second sources for other x86 CPUs include:

Other/uncategorized

See also 
List of former IA-32 compatible processor manufacturers

References 

x86 manufacturers
X86 architecture